"In the Middle" is a song written by Terry Coffey and Jon Nettlesbey and recorded by American recording artist Alexander O'Neal. It is the second single from his fifth studio album, Love Makes No Sense (1993). The song's distinctive backing vocals were performed by Cherrelle. Following the successful chart performances of the single "Love Makes No Sense", "In the Middle" was released as the album's second single.

The single was recorded by Wolfgang Aichholz at Winsonics, Los Angeles, CA.

Release
Alexander O'Neal's 24th hit single and it reached #32 in the UK Singles Chart. In the United States, the single reached #26 on the Billboard Hot R&B/Hip-Hop Singles & Tracks chart.

Track listing

 7" single (587 714-7)
"In the Middle (Radio Mix)"
"In the Middle (Brown Mix)"

 12" single (587 715-1)
"In the Middle (Brown Mix)"
"In the Middle (The Qat Concept Mix)"
"In the Middle (The Glam Slam Mix)"
"In the Middle (Brown Surround Mix)"
"In the Middle (Rapless Mix)"

 CD single (587 715-2)
"In the Middle (Radio Mix)" – 3:43
"In the Middle (Brown Mix)" – 4:34
"In the Middle (Rapless Mix)" – 4:32
"In the Middle (Brown Surround Mix)" – 4:32
"In the Middle (The Qat Concept Mix)" – 12:01
"In the Middle (The Glam Slam Mix)" – 8:12

 Cassette single (31458 7710 4)
"In the Middle (Radio Mix)"
"In the Middle (Instrumental Version)"

Personnel
Credits are adapted from the album's liner notes.

 Alexander O'Neal – lead vocals 
 Terry Coffey – synthesizer programming, keyboards, vocal arrangements 
 Jon Nettlesbey – drum programming, percussion, vocal arrangements 
 Cherrelle – backing vocals
 Sean Devereaux – backing vocals

Charts

References

External links
 

1993 singles
Alexander O'Neal songs
1993 songs
Tabu Records singles
American hip hop songs